This Is Billy Butler! is the debut album by guitarist Billy Butler which was recorded in 1968 and released by Prestige Records.

Reception

Allmusic awarded the album 4 stars stating "It took the Philadelphian 43 years to record as a leader, and this excellent LP proved that he was certainly up to the task".

Track listing

Personnel 
 Billy Butler – guitar, bass guitar
 Houston Person – tenor saxophone
 Ernie Hayes – piano, organ
 Bob Bushnell – bass guitar
 Rudy Collins – drums

References 

Billy Butler (guitarist) albums
1969 debut albums
Prestige Records albums
Albums recorded at Van Gelder Studio
Albums produced by Bob Porter (record producer)